The men's double trap event at the 2012 Olympic Games took place on 2 August 2012 at the Royal Artillery Barracks.

The event consisted of two rounds: a qualifier and a final. In the qualifier, each shooter fired 3 sets of 50 shots in trap shooting. Shots were paired, with two targets being launched at a time.

The top 6 shooters in the qualifying round moved on to the final round. There, they fired one additional round of 50. The total score from all 200 shots was used to determine final ranking. Ties are broken using a shoot-off; additional shots are fired one pair at a time until there is no longer a tie.

Records
Prior to this competition, the existing world and Olympic records were as follows.

Qualification round

Final

References

External links
Olympics London 2012

Shooting at the 2012 Summer Olympics
Men's events at the 2012 Summer Olympics